Nikolay Nikolayevich Govorun (1930–1989) was a Soviet mathematician known best for his contributions to computational mathematics.

Bibliography 
 Николай Николаевич Говорун (1930—1989). Дубна, Объединенный институт ядерных исследований (Библиография научных работ Н. Н. Говоруна). 1990.
 Николай Николаевич Говорун. Книга воспоминаний. Под общей редакцией В. П. Ширикова, Е. М. Молчанова. Сост. А. Г. Заикина, Т. А. Стриж. Дубна, Объединенный институт ядерных исследований, 1999.

References

1930 births
1989 deaths
20th-century Russian mathematicians
Communist Party of the Soviet Union members
Recipients of the Order of the Red Banner of Labour
Numerical analysts